The Haut Sex (also known as Pointe de Recon) (1,961 m) is a mountain of the Chablais Alps, located on the border between Switzerland and France. It lies north of the Tour de Don.

References

External links
 Haut Sex on Hikr

Mountains of Switzerland
Mountains of Haute-Savoie
Mountains of the Alps
Mountains of Valais
One-thousanders of Switzerland